The city of Gusau, located in northwestern Nigeria, is the capital of Zamfara State. It is also the name of the state's Local Government Area (LGA), which has an area of ² and a population of 383,162 as of the 2006 census.
 
The area's postal code is 880.

Geography

Gusau is located north of a line drawn from Kebbe to Kano in Nigeria.

Its diverse ethnic population consists mostly of the Fulani, Hausa, Yoruba, Igbo, Igala, and Nupe ethnic groups.

History
Gusau district was one of the Districts that emerged following the jihad movement of the nineteenth century in Hausa land, led by the legendary Sheikh Usmanu Danfodiyo. It was founded around 1799 by Mallam Muhammadu Sambo Dan Ashafa, a disciple of the Sheikh Danfodio. Gusau district only became prominent after the fall of Yandoto in 1806.
Since its emergence as an important settlement in the Sokoto Caliphate, Gusau town attracted attention as an important agricultural and commercial center. At any rate, the town and its surrounding areas had attracted large presence of agriculturists; farmers and livestock rearers, especially cattle owning Fulani.
Gusau before the colonial period, was an agrarian society, agriculture was the backbone of the economy of the Gusau, the economic activity of the people during this period consisted mainly in farming with other minor supplementary occupation, Although, like most other Hausa town’s agriculture remained the main activity. In the area there were builders, thatches, butchers, blacksmiths, drummers, praise-singers, e.t.c.
Gusau and the territory assigned to Mallam Sambo Dan Ashafa falls within the metropolitan section of the caliphate. In Gusau after the consolidation of Mallam Sambo with their Headquarters at Gusau had under the territories of Wonaka, Mada, Yandoto, Samri, Magami, Marabu, Mareri, Mutumji, Kwaren Ganuwa, Wanke and a group of villages around Gusau, like other parts of the caliphate.
In territorial administration besides the fief holders in the outlying territory, the town was broken into five wards namely, Shiyar Magaji, Uban Dawaki, Galadima, Mayana and Sarkin Fada. They were the vital links between the people in their respective wards and the Sarkin katsinan Gusau (Emir Of Gusau). They are the eyes and ears of Sarki. Gusau like other parts of the Caliphate send a share of its revenue to the Sultan Of Sokoto.
The coming of colonialism brought about certain developments and transformations of the societies in Gusau. Colonial infrastructures such as tarred roads, railways, modern stores, businesses as well as modern manufactures were all brought to the town. Similarly, modern residences, offices, schools and hospital were added to the town which aided and further enhanced, its expansion and modernization process.
However, there are colonial policies that were introduced by the colonial administration which changed the system of political administration. The Gusau area is something of an anachronism. It was not a division but is treated as such in all respects politically, in which respect it has the status of a touring area. During the colonial administration 1907, they introduced cattle tax (Jangali).
During the colonial period agriculture remained the main economic activity of Gusau, with economic potentials and also is a predominantly agricultural society, Agriculture was the mainstay of the economy and was mainly undertaken in Damina with the cultivation of major crops.
Gusau covers a total land area of approximately 3469 square kilometers. The area within which Gusau is located is interrupted by few little rocky outcrops, such as hills of Mareri and Dokau.Gusau enjoys a tropical type of climate largely controlled by two masses, namely the tropical and maritime.

Emirate
The city of Gusau now has a First class Emir, HRH Alh  Ibrahim Muhammad Bello Sarkin Katsinan Gusau who was crowned After the death of Alh Kabir Muhammad DanBaba by the former Governor AbdulAziz yari Abubakar in 2015.

Climate
Gusau has a tropical savanna climate (Köppen climate classification Aw).

See also 
 Gusau Dam
 Gusau Airstrip
 Railway stations in Nigeria
Federal Medical Centre, Gusau

References 

Local Government Areas in Zamfara State
State capitals in Nigeria
Populated places in Zamfara State